There are several rivers named Jacaré River in Brazil:

 Jacaré River (Alagoas)
 Jacaré River (Bahia, Das Contas River tributary), eastern Brazil
 Jacaré River (Bahia, São Francisco River tributary), eastern Brazil
 Jacaré River (Minas Gerais), southeastern Brazil
 Jacaré River (Piquiri River tributary), southern Brazil
 Jacaré River (Purus River tributary), north-western Brazil
 Jacaré River (Das Cinzas River tributary),  southern Brazil
 Jacaré River (Sergipe, Piauí River tributary)
 Jacaré River (Sergipe, São Francisco River tributary)
 Jacaré Grande River, Pará state, north-central Brazil

See also
 Jacaré (disambiguation)